Boksburg Commando was a light infantry regiment of the South African Army. It formed part of the South African Army Infantry Formation as well as the South African Territorial Reserve.

History

Origin
The first Boksburg Commando was originally  mobilised in 1899 and moved to the Transvaal border.

Operations

With the Zuid Afrikaanse Republiek
When the Anglo Boer war was declared this commando crossed the border and occupied Newcastle in Natal.

Under Commandant A.J. Dercksen, the Commando had a combined strength of 2,013 with the Germiston and Johannesburg Commandos.

The commando fought at Sandspruit, Colenso, Hlangwane, Thukela, Pieter's Hill, Driefontein, Lang's Nek, Donkerhoek, Komati Poort, Renosterkop, Helvetia, and in North Eastern Transvaal.

Other operations in this era include:
 Battle of Elandslaagte (1899)
 Derailing of an armoured train near Colenso and capture of Winston Churchill
 Battle of Colenso (1899)
 Battle of Spion Kop (1900)
 Battle of Bergendal (1900)

Under the Union Defence Force
By 1902 all Commando remnants were under British military control and disarmed.

By 1912, however previous Commando members could join shooting associations.

By 1940, such commandos were under control of the National Reserve of Volunteers.

These commandos were formally reactivated by 1948.

Rebellion Leaders
General C.F. Muller, a previous member of the Boksburg Commando, was one of the 1915 rebellion leaders.

Under the SADF
During this era, the unit was mainly engaged in area force protection, search and cordons as well as other assistance to the local police.

As an urban unit, this commando was also tasked with protecting strategic facilities as well as quelling township riots especially during the State of Emergency in the 1980s.

Under the SANDF

Disbandment
This unit, along with all other Commando units was disbanded after a decision by South African President Thabo Mbeki to disband all Commando Units. The Commando system was phased out between 2003 and 2008 "because of the role it played in the apartheid era", according to the Minister of Safety and Security Charles Nqakula.

Unit Insignia

SADF era insignia

Leadership

References

See also 
 South African Commando System

Infantry regiments of South Africa
South African Commando Units
Military units and formations of the Second Boer War
Disbanded military units and formations in the East Rand